Budy-Grzybek  is a village in the administrative district of Gmina Jaktorów, within Grodzisk Mazowiecki County, Masovian Voivodeship, in east-central Poland.

The village has a population of 700.

References

Budy-Grzybek